This is the progression of world record improvements of the long jump W75 division of Masters athletics.

Key

References

Masters Athletics Long Jump list
Long Jump Runway Dimensions | Long Jump Pit Sizes

Masters athletics world record progressions
Long